The Ethiopian Space Science and Technology Institute (ESSTI) is an Ethiopian institute for research, training and infrastructure development in space science, created in 2016.

Creation
The Ethiopian Space Science Society (ESSS) was created as a citizens' association in 2004. ESSS helped to organise the creation of Entoto Observatory in 2014 and of the Ethiopian Space Science and Technology Institute in 2016. ESSTI was formally established by the Hailemariam Desalegn Cabinet, under regulation No. 916/2015.

Aims
ESSTI was mandated to carry out research and training in space science and to develop and encourage space science and aerospace development and infrastructure in Ethiopia.

Leadership and structure
Abdissa Yilma was ESSTI's general director in 2021. , Yeshurun Alemayehu was ESSTI's deputy general director.

Together with the creation of ESSTI, the Space Council was created to oversee Ethiopian space science policies and the implementation of ESSTI proposals.

Satellite launches
ESSTI's first satellite, ETRSS-1, is a 72 kg remote sensing microsatellite, co-designed by Ethiopian and Chinese engineers and launched in December 2019.

ESSTI's second satellite, ET-SMART-RSS, an 8.9 kg nanosatellite, also designed and built in Ethiopian–Chinese collaboration, was launched from Wenchang Spacecraft Launch Site on 22 December 2020.

Research and teaching
Research and teaching departments in ESSTI include the Astronomy and Astrophysics Research Department, with research in fields including extragalactic astronomy, stellar astronomy, cultural astronomy and cosmology. , the department had graduated 11 master's students and 5 doctoral students. Mirjana Pović, an assistant professor of the department and head of the department from 2018 to 2020, was awarded the inaugural Jocelyn Bell Burnell Inspiration Medal in 2021 by the European Astronomical Society for her contributions to the development of "astronomy, science and education as a route out of poverty and to improve the quality of life for young people in Africa."

References

Space technology research institutes
Organisations based in Ethiopia
2016 establishments in Ethiopia